The Antics of Ann is a lost 1917 American silent comedy film directed by Edward Dillon and starring Ann Pennington.

Plot
As described in a film magazine, after breaking every rule in the Bredwell Seminary, Ann Wharton (Pennington) is dismissed. Seeking to beat the notification of her dismissal to her father, she runs away from school that night. She goes to sleep in a row boat and is awakened the next morning when her craft bumps a railroad bridge. After meeting Tom Randall (Ham), with whom she has formed a friendship, he takes her home where her father (Carleton) finds them, having been appraised by the seminary principal who hinted at an elopement. Ann is then taken to a winter resort where her father and sister Olive (Hawley) are staying. Here Tom finds her again. She breaks up an elopement of her sister and a fortune hunter by going to the latter's room and staying there until the time for the tryst has passed. Accused of compromising herself by her father, she goes to Tom's apartment and demands that he marry her, which he does. The couple receive the blessing of her father.

Cast
Ann Pennington as Ann Wharton
Harry Ham as Tom Randall
Ormi Hawley as Olive Wharton
Crauford Kent as Gordon Trent
William T. Carleton as Mr. Wharton (credited as W. T. Carleton)
Charlotte Granville as Mrs. Bredwell

References

External links

Color lobby card (archived)
Color action card (archived)
kinotv

1917 films
American silent feature films
Films directed by Edward Dillon
1917 comedy films
Silent American comedy films
Lost American films
American black-and-white films
1917 lost films
Lost comedy films
1910s American films